Șieu-Odorhei is a commune in Bistrița-Năsăud County, Transylvania, Romania. It is composed of seven villages: Agrișu de Jos, Agrișu de Sus, Bretea, Coasta, Cristur-Șieu, Șieu-Odorhei and Șirioara.

At the 2011 census, 91.1% of inhabitants were Romanians and 8.3% Hungarians.

References

Communes in Bistrița-Năsăud County
Localities in Transylvania